Serrano Island, also known as Little Wellington Island, is an island in the Aisén Region, Chile. It should not be confused with Lavoisier Island in the Antarctica, which is also called Isla Serrano in Spanish.

External links
 United Nations, Islands Watch

Islands of Aysén Region